The Honeymoon Machine is a 1961 American comedy film directed by Richard Thorpe and starring Steve McQueen, Brigid Bazlen, Jim Hutton, Paula Prentiss, Jack Mullaney, and Dean Jagger, based on the 1959 Broadway play The Golden Fleecing by Lorenzo Semple Jr. In the film, three men devise a plan to win at roulette with a United States Navy computer. The scheme works until an admiral ruins their plans.

Plot
Civilian scientist Jason Eldridge runs Magnetic Analyzer Computing Synchrotron (MACS), a vacuum tube computer aboard the United States Navy ship USS Elmira.  He and his friend Lt. Ferguson Howard realize that, by using MACS to record a roulette table's spins over time, the computer can predict future results. Howard and LTJG Beauregard Gilliam check into a Venice casino's hotel dressed as civilians with Eldridge, defying Admiral Fitch's order that naval officers on shore avoid the casino and wear uniforms. They plan to use signal lamps to communicate with a confederate manning MACS on the Elmira.

At the hotel, dedicated bachelor Howard meets and romances Julie Fitch, the admiral's daughter. Eldridge reunites with former girlfriend and heiress Pam Dunstan, in Venice to marry another man. The betting system is very effective, and the three men accumulate hundreds of thousands of dollars in casino chips; the money gives Eldridge the confidence to propose to Dunstan. However, Admiral Fitch sees and investigates their signals; soon the Navy, the American and Soviet consulates, and Venice city authorities are on alert for a "revolution".

The gamblers get Signalman Burford Taylor, who finds their signal lamp, drunk to detain him, but Taylor escapes and reports to the admiral. Julie Fitch tells her father that she and Howard have "got to marry" each other to save him from court-martial. The Soviets accuse the Navy of using MACS to steal from the casino. To avoid an international incident Howard agrees to intentionally lose all his chips on his last bet, but a riot breaks out between Soviets, Americans, and Italians in the casino over the chips. The movie ends with newlyweds Howard and Fitch celebrating their honeymoon in the hotel.

Cast
 Steve McQueen as Lt. Ferguson 'Fergie' Howard.  McQueen was second choice for this role, after Cary Grant turned the part down.
 Brigid Bazlen as Julie Fitch
 Jim Hutton as Jason Eldridge
 Paula Prentiss as Pam Dunstan
 Dean Jagger as Admiral Fitch
 Jack Weston as Signalman Burford Taylor
 Jack Mullaney as Lt. Beauregard 'Beau' Gilliam
 Marcel Hillaire as Inspector of casino games
 Ben Astar as Russian consul
 William Lanteau as Tommy Dane
 Ken Lynch as Capt. James Angle
 Simon Scott as Capt. Harvey Adam

Reception
Bosley Crowther, critic for The New York Times was unimpressed, writing "It is a wild and labored operation, and when it finally comes to an end, one wonders whether it has even been bona fide farce." He did, however, appreciate the efforts of the main cast: "It profits by pleasant performers. Jim Hutton, Jack Mullaney and Steve McQueen work hard as the three connivers."

Steve McQueen walked out of the first public sneak preview and vowed never to work for MGM again despite being under contractual obligation for two more pictures.

Box Office
According to MGM records, the film made a profit of $122,000.

See also
 List of American films of 1961

References

External links
 
 
 
 

1961 films
1961 comedy films
American comedy films
American films based on plays
1960s English-language films
Films directed by Richard Thorpe
Films set in Italy
Metro-Goldwyn-Mayer films
Films about roulette
Films with screenplays by George Wells
Films scored by Leigh Harline
1960s American films